The 2015 Internazionali di Tennis del Friuli Venezia Giulia was a professional tennis tournament played on clay courts. It was the eleventh edition of the tournament which was part of the 2015 ATP Challenger Tour. It took place in Cordenons, Italy between 15 and 23 August 2015.

Singles main-draw entrants

Seeds

 1 Rankings are as of August 10, 2015.

Other entrants
The following players received wildcards into the singles main draw:
  Omar Giacalone
  Andrea Pellegrino
  Lorenzo Sonego
  Adelchi Virgili

The following player received entry into the singles main draw as a special exempt:
  Grega Žemlja

The following player entered the singles main draw as an alternate:
  Fernando Romboli

The following players received entry from the qualifying draw:
  Nicola Ghedin
  Nikola Mektić
  Jaume Munar
  Matteo Trevisan

Champions

Singles

  Filip Krajinović def.  Adrian Ungur 5–7, 6–4, 4–1 ret.

Doubles

  Andrej Martin /  Igor Zelenay def.  Dino Marcan /  Antonio Šančić 6–4, 5–7, [10–8]

External links
Official Website

Internazionali di Tennis del Friuli Venezia Giulia
Internazionali di Tennis del Friuli Venezia Giulia
Zucchetti